Dallenwil railway station is a Swiss railway station in the municipality of Dallenwil in the canton of Nidwalden. It is on the Luzern–Stans–Engelberg line, owned by the Zentralbahn railway company.

Services 
The following services stop at Dallenwil:

 Lucerne S-Bahn : hourly service between Lucerne and

References

External links 
 
 

Railway stations in the canton of Nidwalden
Zentralbahn stations